Laboni Sarkar is an Indian actress who is known for her work in Bengali cinema. She is the recipient of three BFJA Awards. She began her acting career in a Bengali TV series by Jochon Dastidar. She made her Big screen debut in Aparna Sen's Sati (1989).

Filmography 

 Aporajeyo (2022)
 Oti Uttam (2022)
 Kolkatar Harry (2021)
 Parineeta (2019)
 Hiralal (2018)
 Maati (2018)
 Boxer (2018)
 Shrestha Bangali (2017)
 Amazon Obhijaan (2017) as Shankar's mother
 Chaamp (2017) as Shibaji's Mother
 Tomake Chai (2017)
 Haripad Bandwala (2016) as Nandalal's Wife
 Jomer Raja Dilo Bor (2015)
 Hriday Haran (2015)
 Obhishopto Nighty (2014)
 Bangali Babu English Mem (2014)
 Chander Pahar (2013) as Shankar's mother
 Khiladi (2013)
 Khoka 420 (2013) as Krrish's Mother
 Chupi Chupi (2013)
 Dekha, Na-Dekhay (2013)
 Challenge 2 (2012) as Pooja's Mother
 Khokababu (2012) as Khoka 420 aka Khoka's Mother
 Romeo (2011) as Sidhu's Mother
 Kashmakash (2011)
 Ami Shubhash Bolchi (2012)
 Josh (2010 film) (2010)
 Le Chakka (2010) as Abir's Mother
 Mon Je Kore Uru Uru (2010)
 Prem Amar (2009)
 Paran Jai Jaliya Re (2009) as Anna's Mother
 Saat Paake Bandha (2009)
 Maa Amar Maa (2009 film) (2009)
 Challenge (2009) as Abhi's Mother
 Rajkumar (2008)
 Mahakaal (2008)
 Bhalobasa Bhalobasa (2008)
 Aparadhi (2008)
 Aamar Pratigya (2008)
 Janmadata (2008)
 Kalishankar (2008)
 Chander Bari (2008)
 Hungama (2006)
 Shubhodrishti (2005)
 Agnipath (2005)
 Kaalpurush (as Labony Sarkar) (2005)
 Badsha The King (2004)
 Guru (2003)
 Katha Deithili Maa Ku (2003)
 Sabuj Saathi (2003)
 Kurukshetra (2002)
 Pratibad (2001)
 Dada Thakur (2001)
 Kichhhu Sanlap Kichhu Pralap (1999)
 Sangharsha (1995)
 Charachar (1994)
 Ponthan Mada (1994)
 Wheel Chair (1994)
 Nabarupa (1992) Sati (1989)

Television 
 Icche Nodi as Malobika Banerjee. (Star Jalsha) 
Mayurpankhi  as Mitali Bose.(Star Jalsha)
Phagun Bou as Mayurakshi Ghosh.(Star Jalsha)
Sanyassi Raja as Iraboti Sen.(Star Jalsha)
Mrs.Sinha Roy  as Dayamanti Sinha Roy.(Sananda TV)
Falna as Ashalata Banerjee.(Star Jalsha)
Uron Tubri as Tubri's mother.(Zee Bangla)

Awards

See also 

 Anashua Majumdar
 Rita Dutta Chakraborty
 Paran Bandopadhyay
 Tanima Sen

References 

Indian film actresses
Indian television actresses
Actresses in Bengali cinema
Living people
Actresses from Kolkata
Bengal Film Journalists' Association Award winners
Kalakar Awards winners
Bengali television actresses
20th-century Indian actresses
21st-century Indian actresses
Year of birth missing (living people)